Alessio Rovera (born 22 June 1995) is an Italian racing driver.

Career

Early career
After starting out in Italian junior racing formulas, Rovera entered the Formula Renault Eurocup in 2014 and competed there for Cram Motorsport. With 65 championship points and three podium finishes, he finished the season in sixth place in the final standings (master Nyck de Vries ahead of Charles Leclerc and Matevos Isaakyan). After a year in the Spanish Formula 3 Championship, he switched to the Porsche Carrera Cup in 2016.

GT racing
Rovera was successful in this racing series from the start. After a third place in Porsche Carrera Cup Italy in 2016, he won this championship in 2017. This was followed by third place in the Porsche Carrera Cup France in the same year and finished runner-up in 2018. He then competed in the Italian GT Championship, where he won the overall standings in the GT3 class in 2019 and 2020.

Racing record

Career summary

† As Rovera was a guest driver, he was ineligible to score points.
* Season still in progress.

Complete European Le Mans Series results
(key) (Races in bold indicate pole position; races in italics indicate fastest lap)

Complete FIA World Endurance Championship results

Complete 24 Hours of Le Mans results

Complete WeatherTech SportsCar Championship results
(key) (Races in bold indicate pole position; results in italics indicate fastest lap)

References

External links

1995 births
Living people
Sportspeople from Varese
Italian racing drivers
24 Hours of Le Mans drivers
FIA World Endurance Championship drivers
Formula Abarth drivers
Formula Renault 2.0 Alps drivers
Euroformula Open Championship drivers
Porsche Supercup drivers
24H Series drivers
International GT Open drivers
European Le Mans Series drivers
Asian Le Mans Series drivers
WeatherTech SportsCar Championship drivers
Cram Competition drivers
BVM Racing drivers
AF Corse drivers
Ferrari Competizioni GT drivers
Iron Lynx drivers